Cesonium cribellum is a species of beetle in the family Cerambycidae, and the sole member of the genus Cesonium. It was described by Karl Jordan in 1903. It is known from Cameroon.

References

Endemic fauna of Cameroon
Lamiini
Beetles described in 1903